The Australian Defense — chess opening, beginning with the moves 1. d2-d4, 2. Nb8-a6.

Details
Refers to Semi-Closed Games, is black's response to Queen's pawn opening. The name of the opening comes from the Australian Champion in 1992 and Ocean Champion in 2000, Aleksandar Wohl, International Master. In tournaments, he repeatedly and effectively used this defense, although in general this debut at world-class competitions is extremely rare. Black's ideas in this defense are similar to White's Durkin Attack, the advantage of the opening is that the pawn structure is not affected.

See also
 List of chess openings
 List of chess openings named after places

References

External links
 Australian Defense 
 Discussion at chess.com

Chess openings
Chess in Australia